Mauritius participated at the 2018 Summer Youth Olympics in Buenos Aires, Argentina from 6 October to 18 October 2018.

Medalists

Medals awarded to participants of mixed-NOC teams are represented in italics. These medals are not counted towards the individual NOC medal tally.

|width="30%" align=left valign=top|

Archery

Individual

Team

Beach handball

Beach volleyball

Canoeing

Mauritius qualified one boat based on its performance at the 2018 World Qualification Event.

 Boys' C1 - 1 boat

Equestrian

Mauritius was given a rider to compete from the tripartite committee.

 Individual Jumping - 1 athlete

Weightlifting

Mauritius was given a quota by the tripartite committee to compete in weightlifting.

Boy

Girl

References

You
Nations at the 2018 Summer Youth Olympics
Mauritius at the Youth Olympics